Mayerling is a 1936 French historical drama film directed by Anatole Litvak and produced by Seymour Nebenzal from a screenplay by Marcel Achard, Joseph Kessel, and Irma von Cube, based on the 1930 novel Idyll's End by Claude Anet.

The film stars Charles Boyer and Danielle Darrieux with René Bergeron, Jean Davy, Jean Dax, Jean Debucourt and Gabrielle Dorziat, and Jean-Louis Barrault in a bit part. The film is based on the real-life story of Crown Prince Rudolf of Austria, his affair with the 17-year-old Baroness Maria Vetsera and their tragic end at Mayerling.

The film was remade twice. Once as the 1957 film Mayerling directed by Anatole Litvak himself and starring Mel Ferrer and Audrey Hepburn. It was also remade as the 1968 film Mayerling in color by MGM, starring Omar Sharif, Catherine Deneuve, James Mason, and Ava Gardner.

Plot
Vienna is disturbed by protestors agitating for political change. Crown Prince Rudolph is arrested at a meeting. His father Emperor Franz Joseph insists he get married and settle down. Rudolph reluctantly agrees.

Five years later, Rudolph has become an unhappy playboy. On the night of his wedding anniversary he meets Baroness Marie Vetsera and they fall in love.

Cast
Charles Boyer as Archduke Rudolph of Austria
Jean Dax as Emperor Franz Joseph I of Austria
Jean Debucourt as Count Taafe
Marthe Regnier as Baroness Vetsera (Helene)
Danielle Darrieux as Marie Vetsera
Suzy Prim as Countess Larisch
Vladimir Sokoloff as Chief of Police
Andre Dubosc as Loschek the Valet
René Bergeron as Szeps
Gabrielle Dorziat as Empress Elisabeth
Raymond Aimos 	
Gina Manès as Marinka
Yolande Laffron as Stephanie

Reception
Writing for The Spectator in 1936, Graham Greene gave the film a poor review, describing it as "purposeless" and "a too romantic manner for [his] taste". Greene particularly criticizes the conclusion of the film which he characterized as "a Vienna 'musical' without the music: a pathetic ending". Greene did, however, praise the  film's production and acting.

Restoration
A restored DVD was issued in the U.S. by The Criterion Collection (Essential Art House) on September 15, 2009.

References

External links
 film review
 
 
Mayerling at Criterion Collection
Film review at New York Times
Mayerling on Lux Radio Theater: January 9, 1939

French historical drama films
1936 films
Films directed by Anatole Litvak
Rudolf, Crown Prince of Austria
1930s historical drama films
Films set in 1884
Films set in 1889
Films set in Vienna
Biographical films about Austrian royalty
Cultural depictions of Empress Elisabeth of Austria
Cultural depictions of Franz Joseph I of Austria
French black-and-white films
Films scored by Arthur Honegger
1936 drama films
Films set in Austria-Hungary
1930s French films